András Lénárt (born 14 April 1998) is a Slovak footballer who plays as midfielder for TJ Družstevník Trstice.

Career
In the summer 2016, Lénárt joined Videoton FC on a contract until 2020. One year later he was sent out on loan at 1. FC Tatran Prešov until the end of 2017. In February 2018, he was loaned out to BFC Siófok.

On 18 February 2019 it was announced, that Lénárt had joined Družstevník Trstice.

References 

1998 births
Living people
Slovak footballers
Association football midfielders
Slovak Super Liga players
Nemzeti Bajnokság I players
Nemzeti Bajnokság II players
Győri ETO FC players
Fehérvár FC players
1. FC Tatran Prešov players
BFC Siófok players
Sportspeople from Šaľa